Nikolett Szilágyi (born 25 September 2005) is a Hungarian artistic gymnast who represented Hungary at the inaugural Junior World Championships.

Early life 
Nikolett Szilágyi was born in Debrecen, Hungary on 25 September 2005.

Gymnastics career

Espoir

2017–18 
In April 2017 Szilágyi competed at the Elek Matolay Memorial where she placed first in the all-around in her age division.

In June 2018 Szilágyi competed at Gym Festival Trnava where she placed third in the all-around.  She next competed at the Olympic Hopes Cup where she helped Hungary finish first as a team.  Individually she placed fifth in the all-around, fourth on balance beam, and fifth on floor exercise.

2019
Szilágyi began the year competing at the Elek Matolay Memorial, International GymSport, and Gym Festival Trnava.  She was selected to represent Hungary at the inaugural Junior World Championships alongside Mirtill Makovits and Hanna Szujó; they finished sixteenth as a team.  Szilágyi ended the year competing at the Olympic Hopes Cup where she helped Hungary finish third.  Individually she fourteenth in the all-around but won bronze on balance beam.

Senior

2021 
Szilágyi turned senior in 2021.  She competed at the Hungarian Super Team Championships and the Hungarian Event Championships.  At the Gym Festival Trnava Szilágyi finished first in the all-around, vault, and floor exercise and third on uneven bars and balance beam.  At the Hungarian Championships she placed second in the all-around behind Dorina Böczögö.  Szilágyi was selected to represent Hungary at the 2021 World Championships alongside Csenge Bácskay, Zója Székely, and Zsófia Kovács.

Competitive history

References

External links 
 

2005 births
Living people
Hungarian female artistic gymnasts
Sportspeople from Debrecen
21st-century Hungarian women